Petushki (lit. little roosters) is a town and the administrative center of Petushinsky District in Vladimir Oblast, Russia, located on the left bank of the Klyazma River on the Moscow–Nizhny Novgorod railway and motorway,  west of Vladimir, the administrative center of the oblast. Population:

History

It was founded near Petushki railway station, which was opened in 1861. Town status was granted to it in 1965.

Administrative and municipal status
Within the framework of administrative divisions, Petushki serves as the administrative center of Petushinsky District, to which it is directly subordinated. As a municipal division, the town of Petushki is incorporated within Petushinsky Municipal District as Petushki Urban Settlement.

See also
Moscow-Petushki, a prose poem that involves the town

References

Notes

Sources

Cities and towns in Vladimir Oblast
Pokrovsky Uyezd